Antwaun Molden (born January 23, 1985) is a former American football cornerback. He was drafted by the Houston Texans in the third round of the 2008 NFL Draft. He played college football for Eastern Kentucky.

Early years
Molden was born in Warren, Ohio.  He attended Eastern Kentucky University, where he played for the Eastern Kentucky Colonels football team from 2004 to 2007.

Professional career

Houston Texans
Molden was the Houston Texans' second pick in the 2008 draft.

New England Patriots
On August 31, Molden was claimed off waivers by the New England Patriots. He recorded two interceptions.

New York Giants
On April 11, 2012, Molden agreed to terms with the New York Giants. On August 27, 2012, his contract was terminated.

Jacksonville Jaguars
Molden was signed by the Jacksonville Jaguars on November 27, 2012. He was waived on May 7, 2013.

Toronto Argonauts
On May 28, 2014, Molden was signed by the Toronto Argonauts of the Canadian Football League. He announced his retirement in August 2014.

References

External links
Eastern Kentucky Colonels bio
Houston Texans bio
Jacksonville Jaguars bio

1985 births
Living people
Players of American football from Cleveland
American football cornerbacks
Toledo Rockets football players
Eastern Kentucky Colonels football players
Houston Texans players
New England Patriots players
New York Giants players
Jacksonville Jaguars players